The Comedy of Errors is a farcical comedy play by William Shakespeare.

Comedy of Errors may also refer to:

 The Comedy of Errors (musical), adapted by Trevor Nunn
 BBC Television Shakespeare - Season Six - The Comedy of Errors (1983) directed by James Cellan Jones
 Comedy of Errors (horse), a champion British racehorse of the 1970s

See also
A Comedy of Terrors, 2021 historical novel by Lindsey Davis